Zachary Nutting is an American politician. He serves as a Republican member for the Cheshire 11th district of the New Hampshire House of Representatives.

Life and career 
Nutting was a service manager.

In September 2022, Nutting defeated Max Santonastaso in the Republican primary election for the Cheshire 11th district of the New Hampshire House of Representatives. In November 2022, he defeated Natalie Quevedo in the general election, winning 53 percent of the votes. He assumed office in December 2022.

References 

Living people
Year of birth missing (living people)
Place of birth missing (living people)
Republican Party members of the New Hampshire House of Representatives
21st-century American politicians